War All the Time is the fourth release and second full-length by hardcore punk band Poison Idea, released in 1987 by Alchemy Records. It is named after a book by Charles Bukowski.

It was re-released by Tim/Kerr in 1994.

Track listing
"The Temple" (Jerry A.) - 2:42
"Romantic Self Destruction" (Jerry A., Pig Champion) - 2:37
"Push the Button" (Jerry A., Eric Olsen, Steve Hanford) - 2:03
"Ritual Chicken" (Eric Olsen) - 0:58
"Nothing Is Final" (Jerry A.) - 2:40
"Motorhead" (Lemmy Kilmister) - 2:44
"Hot Time" (Jerry A., Chris Tense) - 3:12
"Steel Rule" (Jerry A., Eric Olsen) - 3:23
"Typical" (Jerry A.) - 1:42
"Murder" (Jerry A., Chris Tense) - 2:23
"Marked for Life" (Jerry A.) - 2:58

Personnel
Jerry A. - Vocals
Tom "Pig Champion" Roberts - Guitar
Eric "Vegetable" Olsen - Guitar
Chris Tense - Bass
Steve "Thee Slayer Hippy" Hanford - Drums

References

Poison Idea albums
1987 albums
Alchemy Records (U.S.) albums